Sachy may refer to:
Laurent Sachy (born 1968), French footballer
 (born 1944), French footballer
Nicolas Sachy (born 1967), French footballer
Sachy, Ardennes, a commune in France
Sachy (writer) (1972–2020), Indian writer
Šachy or chess, a game

See also
 Sachi or Shachi, the Hindu goddess of beauty
 Sachi (name)